"Samson" is a song written and recorded by American singer-songwriter Regina Spektor, from her albums Songs and Begin to Hope. Despite having never been officially released as a single, it has charted in several countries, and is often considered one of Spektor's greatest songs. As of 2009 it has sold 143,000 copies in United States.

Background and composition
"Samson" was initially recorded as the first track for Spektor's second album Songs, which she recorded in one take on Christmas Day 2001. In 2006, Spektor re-recorded the song for her album Begin to Hope, which, unlike Songs, had a major label backing.

Lyrically, "Samson" references the biblical episode of Samson and Delilah, found in Judges 16. Samson was granted extraordinary physical strength by God, though his strength was held in his hair, without which he was powerless. He fell in love with Delilah, who, because of his lust for women, discovered his vulnerability, and used it against him.

The song is composed in the key of B major. The earlier recording from Songs has a tempo of 76 beats per minute, whereas the Begin to Hope version was recorded at a significantly faster tempo of 90 beats per minute. The song alters between bars of 6/4 and bars of 4/4. Spektor's voice ranges from the low note of B3 to the high notes of D♯5.

Music video
"Samson" had an accompanying music video, despite not having been released as a single. The video was shot in almost black and white, and revolved around Spektor performing the song on a piano whilst paper designs pan over the camera.

Charts
Despite not being released as a single, the Begin to Hope version of "Samson" charted in four countries, being Spektor's most charted single to date (along with "Fidelity").

Covers
"Samson" has been performed by the following contestants on reality singing competitions:

 Alice Hagenbrant on  season 7 of Idol (Sweden), 2010
 Casey Withoos on season 1 of The Voice (Australia), 2012
 Stephanie Müller on season 4 of The Voice of Germany, 2014
 Korin Bukowski and Chase Kerby on season 9 of The Voice (U.S.), 2015
 Brianna Holm on season 5 of The Voice (Australia), 2016
 Karlee Metzger on season 11 of The Voice (U.S.), 2016

References

Songs based on the Bible
Regina Spektor songs
2000s ballads
2001 songs
Pop ballads
Cultural depictions of Samson